Chapinophis xanthocheilus is a species of snake in the family Colubridae . It is endemic to Guatemala, and has only been found in the cloud forests of the Sierra de las Minas range. This species is the only member of the monotypic genus Chapinophis.

References 

Colubrids
Reptiles of Guatemala
Endemic fauna of Guatemala
Monotypic reptile genera